Vacusus vicinus is a species of antlike flower beetle in the family Anthicidae. It is found in the Caribbean Sea, Central America, North America, Oceania, and South America.

References

Further reading

 
 

Anthicidae
Articles created by Qbugbot
Beetles described in 1849